The four Beromic languages are a branch of the Plateau languages spoken in central Nigeria by approximately 1 million people.

Classification
The following classification is taken from Blench (2008).

Blench (2019) also includes Nincut.

Names and locations
Below is a list of language names, populations, and locations from Blench (2019).

Comparative vocabulary
Sample basic vocabulary of Beromic languages from Blench (2006):

Notes

References
Blench (2008) . Manuscript.

External links
Roger Blench: Beromic page

 
Plateau languages